Toddington Manor is a 19th-century country house in the English county of Gloucestershire, near the village of Toddington. It is in the gothic style and was designed by Charles Hanbury-Tracy, 1st Baron Sudeley for himself and built between 1819 and 1840. Upon completion, a volume on its architecture was published by John Britton (antiquary). It is a Grade I listed building.

Hanbury-Tracy was a gentleman-architect who was influenced by the work of John Carter of the Society of Antiquaries. As one of the earliest Gothic Revival houses, the building shaped the course of British architectural history in an indirect way: when the Houses of Parliament were to be rebuilt after the fire in 1834, Hanbury-Tracy headed the jury to the competition, and the architect of the winning design, Charles Barry, obviously adapted his entry to the taste exemplified in Toddington. The family owned the house until 1893 when Charles Hanbury-Tracy, 4th Baron Sudeley, and his writer wife Ada had to sell due to bankruptcy.

The last private owner, Isabel Andrews, whose husband had bought the estate in 1901, died in 1935 and it stood empty until September 1939, when it was purchased by the National Union of Teachers, who had moved out of London to avoid air raids. The NUT staff both lived and worked in the building. Following Dunkirk a tented encampment was erected in the grounds and temporarily occupied by men evacuated from the beaches. They were later followed by units of the British Army. In 1942 the Pioneer Corps built a more permanent hutted encampment, which was occupied by units of the United States Army from October 1942. In August 1943 the NUT moved back to London and the US Army took over the house as well. After the war the Congregation of Christian Brothers rented the property and in 1948 the NUT sold it to them. In the late 1970s, it was converted into an international boarding school, Toddington Manor College. In 2004, following the school's closure, planning permission to convert it into a hotel was denied after the scheme had attracted considerable local opposition.

In 2005 it was purchased by the artist Damien Hirst who planned to restore it and use it as a family home and a gallery, both his own works and for his collection of works by other artists. Since 2006, Toddington Manor has been encased in what Hirst claims is the world's biggest span of scaffolding. As at 2022, the manor remains encased in scaffolding and sheeting, restoration work having stalled for over 17 years. The manor is listed on Historic England’s Heritage at Risk Register.

References

Further reading 
 Britton, John: Graphic Illustrations ... of Toddington, London 1840.
 Schmidt, Leo: "Toddington Manor: The Genesis of a Gothic Revival Country House." Construction Techniques in the Age of Historicism, Munich 2013: 34–45.

External links 
Toddington Manor entry from The DiCamillo Companion to British & Irish Country Houses
 British Listed Buildings (Source: English Heritage)

Country houses in Gloucestershire
Gothic Revival architecture in Gloucestershire
Houses completed in 1840
Grade I listed houses in Gloucestershire
Structures on the Heritage at Risk register